JCM Farming is a privately held company incorporated in 1990 that seems to be based in Solana Beach, California.   Court records indicate Carol Marrelli is an owner or officer of the firm. The firm also seems to own and operate the Oasis Ranch near Indio, California in the Coachella Valley. The firm has been involved in a number of lawsuits designed to prevent the ranch from being flown over by crop dusters, hot air balloonss and other aircraft. JCM Farming, Inc., and its affiliates own dozens of properties throughout Riverside County, some still held since the early 1970s.

The firm does not provide information as to its ownership, activities or properties.

Press reports indicate the Oasis Ranch facility was built in 1999 on 24 acres and is surrounded by a 24-foot wall  14-feet thick. Other defenses include a partial moat, guard dogs, armed guards and video cameras. The compound includes two large buildings and a Moorish-style bell tower. The company describes the ranch as “an eighty-acre olive farm.” Other documents indicate the farm is in fact a "Private Event and Meeting Center" — "a respite for and marketed to State Departments, foreign dignitaries, diplomats, Fortune 500 executives and their boards, ultra high net worth individuals and their families and celebrities."

Starting by 2009 at the latest, the firm began a series of lawsuits against the operators of hot air balloons in the valley claiming harassment and invasion of privacy. The suits asked for an end to the flights, legal fees and unspecified damages. Some of the defendants have claimed that the corporation has delayed court proceedings in order to drive up defense costs.

Thirteen of fifteen balloonists named in the suit have been forced out of business. In mid-August the defendants were to inspect the enclosure in order to evaluate claims of $750,000 in business damage caused by the over flights. On Monday 15 August 2011 the legal actions were dropped by the firm and the inspection cancelled.  The balloonists then petitioned the Superior Court for JCM Farming to pay their legal fees, arguing the balloonists perform public good.  The Superior Court denied this request, and the balloonists appealed.  The three judge panel at the Fourth Appellate District, Division Three, denied their request affirming the lower court's ruling and stated that "this lawsuit did not result in the enforcement of an important right affecting the public interest."  JCM Farming was then awarded recovery of "costs on appeal," further emphasizing the lack of public good performed by balloonists.

Additionally, JCM Farming sued the FAA (Department of Transportation), USDA, and an airplane operator under contract with the United States to stop frequent, dangerously low, overflights by the operator over the ranch.  The parties settled with a lifetime restraining order established over the property whereby the airplane operator may only fly over the ranch with JCM Farming's unilateral permission.

References

American companies established in 1990
Companies based in San Diego County, California
1990 establishments in California